TINGeLING (established 1997 in Trondheim, Norway) is a Norwegian jazz band, initiated by vocalist
Eldbjørg Raknes.

The band's pianist Maria Kannegaard, has been replaced by Christian Wallumrød (2001) or Steinar Nickelsen (2003–). They toured in Norway 2002, with a performance where they presented lyrics by Karin Boye, and has also been widely used at Norwegian jazz festivals, as well as internationally (e.g. Montreaux Jazz Festival, 2004). Supported by Norsk Jazzforum, TINGeLING toured Scandinavia, France and Belgium (2005), and performed Norway's contribution to Jazz around the world (2006).

Band members
Eldbjørg Raknes – vocals
Nils-Olav Johansen – guitar
Maria Kannegaard – keyboards
Per Oddvar Johansen – percussion

Discography
TINGeLING (1997, NorCD), with lyrics by Rudyard Kipling, Ernest Hemingway and Emily Dickinson
So much depends upon a red wheel barrow (2002, Platearbeiderne), commissioned work for «Vossajazz»
I live suddenly (2006, My Recordings), with lyrics by Paul Celan, Emily Brontë, Robert Frost, Pablo Neruda, Dorothy Parker.

References

External links
Eldbjørg Raknes TINGeLING Biography - Cosmopolite.no

Norwegian jazz composers
Norwegian jazz ensembles
Musical groups established in 1997
Musical groups from Trondheim